Jack Alfred Heinemann is an American-New Zealand academic.

Academic career

After an undergrad at University of Wisconsin-Madison Heinemann studied for a PhD from the University of Oregon. He currently works at the University of Canterbury where he is director of the Centre for Integrated Research in Biosafety.

Heinemann is a vocal critic of the way genetic engineered risks are assessed and the benefits are estimated.

In 2002 he received the New Zealand Association of Scientists Research Medal.

In 2004 Heinemann was awarded an Award of Excellence from the Tertiary Education Union and served as Branch President.

Selected works 
 Heinemann, J. A., & Sprague Jr, G. F. (1989). Bacterial conjugative plasmids mobilize DNA transfer between bacteria and yeast. Nature, 340(6230), 205–209.
 Kiers, E. T., Leakey, R. R., Izac, A. M., Heinemann, J. A., Rosenthal, E., Nathan, D., & Jiggins, J. (2008). Agriculture at a crossroads. Science, 320(5874), 320.
 Heinemann, J. A. (1991). Genetics of gene transfer between species. Trends in Genetics, 7(6), 181–185.
 Heinemann, J. A., Ankenbauer, R. G., & Amábile-Cuevas, C. F. (2000). Do antibiotics maintain antibiotic resistance?. Drug discovery today, 5(5), 195–204.
 Cooper, T. F., & Heinemann, J. A. (2000). Postsegregational killing does not increase plasmid stability but acts to mediate the exclusion of competing plasmids. Proceedings of the National Academy of Sciences, 97(23), 12643–12648.

References

External links
 institutional homepage

Living people
1962 births
New Zealand biologists
University of Wisconsin–Madison alumni
University of Oregon alumni
Academic staff of the University of Canterbury